Pararhyacodrilus is a genus of annelids belonging to the family Naididae.

The species of this genus are found in Europe and Russia.

Species:

Pararhyacodrilus aspersus 
Pararhyacodrilus confusus 
Pararhyacodrilus ekmani 
Pararhyacodrilus palustris

References

Annelids